Belarus 1 is a state-owned television channel in Belarus.

It is the oldest television channel in the country. The channel is on air from 6:00 am to 2:00 am on the next day, in contrast with most public channels in Europe, which broadcast 24-hour programming. It is used to spread propaganda in Belarus.

History
The channel was launched on 1 January 1956, as the Belarusian branch of the Soviet Central Television, after months of preparation. The first spoken words were Good evening! Happy New Year. Today, we start our test run. spoken by Tamara Bastun. Broadcasts were initially running for 2–3 hours every evening on Thursdays, Fridays and Saturdays.

Censorship and propaganda 

International experts and the Belarusian democracy movement have traditionally called state television one of the most important propaganda tools of Lukashenko's regime. It is accused of disinformation, propaganda of political repression, election manipulation, and insulting critics of the regime.

Employees and top managers of state television companies, including Belteleradiocompany, which owns Belarus 1, have been repeatedly put in the EU-led list of people and organizations sanctioned in relation to human rights violations in Belarus, have been included in the Specially Designated Nationals and Blocked Persons List, the sanction lists of the United Kingdom, Switzerland.

According to a journalist who left the channel during the 2020–2021 Belarusian protests in August 2020, Belarus 1 was severely censored. For example, there was a list of people whose names could not be mentioned in the news, which included opposition politicians, there was a blacklist of economists and political scientists, who could not be asked for comments, the use of the words "Stalinism," "cult of personality," " Gulag" was prohibited. TV news unit journalist Alyaksandr Luchonak, who also resigned in protest of propaganda, also confirmed the existence of censorship.

References

External links
 Official English website

Television stations in Belarus
Television channels and stations established in 1956
Mass media in Minsk
1956 establishments in Belarus